ATMOS (Autonomous Truck Mounted howitzer System) is a 155 mm/52 calibre self-propelled gun system manufactured by Israeli military manufacturer  Soltam Systems.

The system is long range, fast moving, truck mounted with high firepower and mobility, rapid deployment, short response time, operable in all terrain areas. The system is integrated with a fully computerized system, providing an automatic control, accurate navigation and target acquisition, the system is offered with various gun barrel lengths, ranging from 39 to 52 calibre, in order to meet different customer requirements.

Overview
The ATMOS is fitted with a 155 mm/52 calibre ordnance which conforms to NATO Joint Ballistic Memorandum of Understanding (JBMoU), and is mounted on a 6 × 6 cross-country truck chassis. The breech mechanism is horizontal sliding which automatically opens to the right with a self-sealing metal obturating ring. The buffer is a hydraulic cylinder with a hydro-pneumatic recuperator. Recoil length is variable from 850 to 1,100 mm with two pneumatic equilibrators. Weapon elevation and traverse are all hydraulic and computer controlled. The gun's aiming gears, load assist systems and spades are operated by a hydraulic power pack. With a 155 mm/52 barrel, a 41 km maximum range can be achieved, using Extended Range Full-Bore - Base Bleed (ERFB-BB) projectile, 30 km firing the NATO L15 High Explosive (HE) projectile and 24.5 km firing the older M107 HE projectile.

The ATMOS 2000 carries a total of 27 155 mm projectiles and associated charges and can be operated by a 4-man crew, consisting of two loaders positioned one either side at the rear. The system provides a rate of fire of between 4 and 9 rds/min.

Development
Late in 2001, Soltam Systems released details of the latest version of its ATMOS 2000 whose existence was first revealed late in 1999. At that time, it was also referred to as the 155 mm Self-Propelled Wheeled Gun (SPWG). The ATMOS was developed as a private venture and is aimed mainly for export markets, although it has already been demonstrated to the Israel Defense Forces (IDF). Wheeled self-propelled guns are usually cheaper to procure than their more common tracked counterparts, have lower life cycle costs and are easier to operate and maintain. In addition, they also have greater strategic mobility and do not rely on Heavy Equipment Transporters (HETs). By late 2001, the system fired over 1,000 rounds, during extensive trials in Israel.

In mid-2003, an undisclosed export customer had placed a contract with the company worth USD5 million for an undisclosed batch of ATMOS 2000 systems. From late 2004 the Israel Defense Forces (IDF) carried out extensive field tests the ATMOS 155 mm/39 calibre system.

There is also a Romanian version, called ATROM, that uses the same 155mm Soltam gun on a locally developed ROMAN 26.360 DFAEG 6x6 truck chassis. This project was put on hold after three prototypes were built.

Operators

Current operators

 – Azerbaijani Army: 6 systems
 - Botswana Defence Force: 5 systems in 2018 
 – Cameroonian Army: 18 systems
 – Philippine Army: 12 systems
 – Royal Thai Army: M758 ATMG - 24 systems  Royal Thai Marine Corps: ATMOS 2000 - 6 systems
 – Romanian Army: ATROM variant 3 prototypes
 – Rwandan Defence Force: at least one ATMOS 2000 system
 – UPDF Land Forces: 6 systems
 – Zambian Army: 6 systems

Future operators 

 – The Army will acquire 18 units of the self-propelled howitzer developed by the Israeli firm Elbit Systems.
 – As of 2017, a development of the ATMOS 2000 was selected to replace the M109s operated by the Israel Defense Forces.
  – The Danish army will acquire 19 units of ATMOS 2000 to replace the 19 ordered units of French produced CAESAR howitzers that has been pledged to the Ukrainian armed forces.

Possible operators 

  –The Atmos 2000 was offered to the Brazilian Army as part of the "VBCOAP 155mm SR" program for the acquisition of 36 Self-propelled howitzer
   – Poland planned but never ordered the AHS Kryl 155mm Howitzer, a domestically made version of the ATMOS 2000

See also

Archer
A-222 Bereg
2S22 Bohdana
CAESAR
DANA
G6 Rhino
AHS Kryl
Nora B-52
PCL-09
PCL-161
PCL-181
PLL-09
Type 19 
ZUZANA

References
Notes

External links
ATMOS brochure on Elbit Systems web site

Video

155 mm artillery
Self-propelled howitzers of Israel
Wheeled self-propelled howitzers
Military vehicles introduced in the 2000s